Drillia janseni is a species of sea snail, a marine gastropod mollusk in the family Drilliidae.

Description
The length of the shell attains 15 mm, its diameter 5.8 mm.

The rather solid shell has a turriform shape. it is white, covered with a dirty yellowish, slightly fibrous cuticle. It contains 8½ whorls separated by a narrow suture. The two whorls of the protoconch are blunt, smooth and shining. The next whorls are gradually increasing in size. The oblique, acute, longitudinal ribs form nodules when crossed by spiral irae. The narrow oval aperture tapers anteriorly into a point and posteriorly gradually turning into a narrow, recurved and rather long siphonal canal

Distribution
This marine species occurs off Chile and Argentina.

References

  Tucker, J.K. 2004 Catalog of recent and fossil turrids (Mollusca: Gastropoda). Zootaxa 682:1–1295

External links
 

janseni
Gastropods described in 1905